Orientalis Ecclesiae is an encyclical of Pope Pius XII signed on 9 April 1944. Its topic is St. Cyril, Patriarch of Alexandria.

External links
Orientalis ecclesiae – Latin text
Orientalis ecclesiae – English text

Encyclicals of Pope Pius XII
April 1944 events
1944 in Christianity